Safaiyeh (also Romanized as Şafā'īyeh; also known as Shāh Godār and Shāhgudār) is a village in Sarab Rural District, in the Central District of Sonqor County, Kermanshah Province, Iran. At the 2006 census, its population was 357, in 89 families.

References 

Populated places in Sonqor County